Isopaches is a genus of liverworts belonging to the family Anastrophyllaceae.

The genus has almost cosmopolitan distribution.

Species:
 Isopaches alboviridis (R.M.Schust.) Schljakov
 Isopaches bicrenatus (Schmidel ex Hoffm.) H.Buch

References

Jungermanniales
Jungermanniales genera